The 185th (2/1st West Riding) Brigade was a formation of the Territorial Force of the British Army. It was assigned to the 62nd (2nd West Riding) Division and served on the Western Front during the First World War.

Formation
The infantry battalions did not all serve at once, but all were assigned to the brigade during the war.
2/5th Battalion, West Yorkshire Regiment
2/6th Battalion, West Yorkshire Regiment 	
2/7th Battalion, West Yorkshire Regiment
2/8th Battalion, West Yorkshire Regiment  	
1/5th (Prince of Wales's) Battalion, Devonshire Regiment
2/20th Battalion, London Regiment (from 9 August 1918)
212th Machine Gun Company
185th Trench Mortar Battery

References

Infantry brigades of the British Army in World War I
Military units and formations in the West Riding of Yorkshire